The House at 170 Otis Street in Newton, Massachusetts is a rare local work of the nationally known Boston architect Hammatt Billings. The two story Second Empire house was built in 1870–71 for Charles Ellis and Emma Claflin Ellis, the daughter of William Claflin, then Governor of Massachusetts, whose own home (no longer extant) was in Newtonville. The house's most prominent feature is its mansard-roofed -story tower, topped with iron cresting.

The house was listed on the National Register of Historic Places in 1986.

See also
 National Register of Historic Places listings in Newton, Massachusetts

References

Houses on the National Register of Historic Places in Newton, Massachusetts
Second Empire architecture in Massachusetts
Houses completed in 1870